Kelbrook and Sough is a civil parish in the Pendle district of Lancashire, England. It has a population of 1,008, and contains the village of Kelbrook and neighbouring hamlet of Sough.

The parish adjoins the Pendle parishes of Laneshaw Bridge, Foulridge, Salterforth and Earby and West Yorkshire.

Prior to 1974 the area was part of the West Riding of Yorkshire.

According to the United Kingdom Census 2011, the parish has a population of 1,008, a decrease from 1,026 in the 2001 census.

The civil parish was created in 1992, from part of the unparished area that before 1974 had been the urban district of Earby.

Media gallery

See also

Listed buildings in Kelbrook and Sough

References
Citations

External links

Map of modern parish boundary at Lancashire County Council website

Civil parishes in Lancashire
Geography of the Borough of Pendle